Dobiegniew railway station is a railway station serving the town of Dobiegniew, in the Lubusz Voivodeship, Poland. The station opened in June 1848 and is located on the Poznań–Szczecin railway. The train services are operated by PKP and Przewozy Regionalne.

The station used to be known as Woldenberg between 1848 and 1909, and Woldenberg (Neumark) from 1910 until 1945.

Train services
The station is served by the following services:

Intercity services Swinoujscie - Szczecin - Stargard - Krzyz - Poznan - Kutno - Warsaw - Bialystok / Lublin - Rzeszow - Przemysl
Intercity services Swinoujscie - Szczecin - Stargard - Krzyz - Poznan - Leszno - Wroclaw - Opole - Katowice - Krakow - Rzeszow - Przemysl
Intercity services Szczecin - Stargard - Krzyz - Poznan - Kutno - Lowicz - Lodz - Krakow
Intercity services Szczecin - Stargard - Krzyz - Pila - Bydgoszcz - Torun - Kutno - Lowicz - Warsaw - Lublin - Rzeszow - Przemysl
Regional services (R) Swinoujscie - Szczecin - Stargard - Dobiegniew - Krzyz - Szamotuly - Poznan

References

 This article is based upon a translation of the Polish language version as of October 2016.

Railway stations in Poland opened in 1848
Railway stations in Lubusz Voivodeship
Strzelce-Drezdenko County
19th-century establishments in the Province of Posen
1848 establishments in Europe